Kampenwand is a mountain of Bavaria, Germany. It features the tallest summit cross of the Bavarian alps.
Its peaks are:
 Kampenwand Hauptgipfel 1669 m
 Kampenwand Ostgipfel 1664 m mit dem 12 m hohen Gipfelkreuz
 Hochplatte 1587 m
 Scheibenwand 1598 m
 Bauernwand 1580 m
 Sonnwendwand 1512 m
 Sulten 1486 m
 Gedererwand 1351 m
 Haindorfer Berg 1122 m
 Adersberg 991 m

References

Mountains of the Alps
Mountains of Bavaria
Chiemgau Alps
One-thousanders of Germany